Trowbridge is a census-designated place (CDP) in Sutter County, California. The 2010 United States census reported Trowbridge's population was 226.

Geography
According to the United States Census Bureau, the CDP covers an area of 6.7 square miles (17.5 km), all of it land.

Climate
According to the Köppen Climate Classification system, Trowbridge has a warm-summer Mediterranean climate, abbreviated "Csa" on climate maps.

Demographics
The 2010 United States Census reported that Trowbridge had a population of 226. The racial makeup of Trowbridge was 167 (73.9%) White, 3 (1.3%) African American, 5 (2.2%) Native American, 25 (11.1%) Asian, 0 (0.0%) Pacific Islander, 15 (6.6%) from other races, and 11 (4.9%) from two or more races. Hispanic or Latino of any race were 38 persons (16.8%).

The Census reported that 226 people (100% of the population) lived in households, 0 (0%) lived in non-institutionalized group quarters, and 0 (0%) were institutionalized.

There were 81 households, out of which 25 (30.9%) had children under the age of 18 living in them, 41 (50.6%) were opposite-sex married couples living together, 10 (12.3%) had a female householder with no husband present, 2 (2.5%) had a male householder with no wife present.  There were 7 (8.6%) unmarried opposite-sex partnerships, and 0 (0%) same-sex married couples or partnerships. 19 households (23.5%) were made up of individuals, and 9 (11.1%) had someone living alone who was 65 years of age or older. The average household size was 2.79.  There were 53 families (65.4% of all households); the average family size was 3.49.

The population was spread out, with 51 people (22.6%) under the age of 18, 20 people (8.8%) aged 18 to 24, 50 people (22.1%) aged 25 to 44, 71 people (31.4%) aged 45 to 64, and 34 people (15.0%) who were 65 years of age or older.  The median age was 43.0 years. For every 100 females, there were 101.8 males.  For every 100 females age 18 and over, there were 101.1 males.

There were 88 housing units at an average density of 13.0 per square mile (5.0/km), of which 64 (79.0%) were owner-occupied, and 17 (21.0%) were occupied by renters. The homeowner vacancy rate was 0%; the rental vacancy rate was 0%.  176 people (77.9% of the population) lived in owner-occupied housing units and 50 people (22.1%) lived in rental housing units.

References

Census-designated places in Sutter County, California
Census-designated places in California